The 5th British Academy Video Game Awards (known for the purposes of sponsorship as GAME British Academy Video Games Awards) awarded by British Academy of Film and Television Arts (BAFTA), was an award ceremony honouring achievement in the field of video games in 2008. Candidate games must have been released in the United Kingdom between 26 October 2007 and 31 December 2008. The ceremony took place in the London Hilton on 10 March 2009. Call of Duty 4: Modern Warfare & Grand Theft Auto IV led with the most nominations with seven, Call of Duty 4: Modern Warfare was the major winner, taking three of the seven awards available.

Timeline
All entries (from either a game's publisher or developer) received before 5 November 2008, were voted on by a first stage panel after grouping into categories by BAFTA. The six games with the most votes in each category move on to a second stage where they are scrutinised by a jury of between seven and nine from December 2008 until January 2009, picked especially for each category. Once the jury has played all the games in a category, a vote by secret ballot decides the winners; the votes were counted by Deloitte LLP.

Nominations
Nominations were announced on 10 February 2009. Along with Call of Duty 4, leading the field on seven nominations was Grand Theft Auto IV, just behind with six nominations was LittleBigPlanet. Despite garnering the joint most nominations, Grand Theft Auto IV would fail to capture any of the awards. LittleBigPlanet similarly failed to live up to the number of nominations by scooping only one gong despite its six nominations.

Categories
Both publishers and developers were eligible to enter their games in fifteen categories, fourteen of which were awarded by a panel of judges. The categories were: Gameplay, Casual, Sports, Story and Character, Strategy, Use of Audio, Multiplayer, Technical Achievement, Original Score, Handheld, People's Choice (the only award voted for by the public), Artistic Achievement, Best Action and Adventure and Best Game.
There was surprise in the announcement of Super Mario Galaxy as the winner of the main award of Game of the Year, as well as the fact that Grand Theft Auto IV did not receive any of the prizes, despite leading the nominations list. Grand Theft Auto IV failed to win an award after receiving six nominations, replicating the "feat" managed by Gears of War at the preceding ceremony.

Winners and nominees
Winners are shown first in bold.

Academy Fellowship
 Nolan Bushnell

Games with multiple nominations and wins

Nominations

Wins

References

External links
5th BAFTA Video Games Awards page

British Academy Games Awards ceremonies
2009 awards in the United Kingdom
2008 in video gaming
March 2009 events in the United Kingdom